Rudolph de Cordova (10 June 1859 – 11 January 1941) was a Jamaican-born British writer, screenwriter and actor. Cordova was born in Kingston, the son of Altamont de Cordova, a prominent merchant, and Katherine Lewis. He went to London to study medicine in the 1880s, but soon abandoned his studies in order to become an actor. His brother was the actor and film director Leander de Cordova. He was also the grandnephew of Jacob de Cordova , and great grandnephew of Raphael de Cordova, a coffee brewer and president of the first synagogue in Philadelphia, Pennsylvania. He is also the cousin of Julian de Cordova, former president of Union Glass Company, and founder of the deCordova Sculpture Park and Museum.

He was married to the writer Alicia Ramsey and collaborated with her on several plays.

Selected filmography
Actor
 The Greatest Power (1917)
 The Trail of the Shadow (1917)
 The Glorious Adventure (1922)
 The Secret Kingdom (1925)

Screenwriter
 Romeo and Juliet (1916)
 Trumpet Island (1920)

References

Bibliography
 Hill, Errol. The Jamaican Stage, 1655–1900, Profile of a Colonial Theatre. University of Massachusetts Press, 1992.

External links

1860 births
1941 deaths
British writers
British male screenwriters
20th-century Jamaican male actors
Jamaican male writers
People from Kingston, Jamaica
Jamaican male film actors
Migrants from British Jamaica to the United Kingdom
20th-century British screenwriters